An autograph is a person's signature, but may also refer to:

Writing
 Autograph collecting, the hobby of collecting autographs
 Autograph (manuscript), a document written entirely in the handwriting of its author
 Autograph letter (Holy See), a letter signed by the pope
 Autograph (Assyriology), a hand-copy of a cuneiform clay-tablet

Film and TV 
 Autograph (2004 film), a Tamil film
 Autograph (2010 film), a Bengali film

Music
 Autograph (American band), an American glam metal band
 Autograph (Russian band), a Soviet and Russian rock band
 Autograph Records, an American jazz record label
 Autograph (album), a 1980 album by John Denver, or the title track
 Autografh, a 2007 album by the American rapper Grafh
 Autograph, an album by Andraé Crouch
 Auto-Graph EP by Le Car 
 "Autograph" (song), a 2016 song by Dallas Smith
 "Autographs", a song by Reks from the 2012 album Straight, No Chaser

Other uses 

 Autograph, a web-based editing tool for digital signage, produced by the Beaver Group
 Autograph ABP, previously known as the Association of Black Photographers, a British-based photographic arts agency
 Autograph (brand), a Marks & Spencer brand
 Autograph Collection, chain of hotels within the Marriott International brand
 Autograph (company), an NFT startup by quarterback Tom Brady
 Autograph (gallery), a gallery of contemporary art in Yekaterinburg

See also 
 Autograft, autotransplantation or grafting of tissues, organs, proteins
 Autografh, album by Grafh